Death to Flying Things is the nickname of three major league baseball players

Jack Chapman, a player from 1874–1875.
Bob Ferguson, a player in the 1860s and 1870s.
Franklin Gutiérrez, a player from 2005 to 2017.